Gerard M. Burns (born 13 June 1961) is a Scottish painter and musician. One of Scotland’s best known portrait artists, Burns has been heralded as one of the country’s leading artists of the human condition, playing a pivotal role in promoting the genre.

Life and art

Burns was born in Glasgow. He graduated from the Glasgow School of Art in 1983 with a degree in Fine Art.

As a student, he conceived the band Valerie & The Week of Wonders with Brian McFie, Greg Kane and Ewan McFie. The group signed to A&M Records & Rondor Publishing in 1984. Burns was the singer, songwriter and guitarist. His subsequent band, Heaven Sent, supported Simple Minds.

He returned to painting in 1990, when he became a Principal of Art at St Aloysius' College, Glasgow. After teaching for a total of 12 years, he became a full-time painter in 1999.

In 2003, Burns was the inaugural receiver of Not The Turner Prize for his figurative oil on canvas, Labyrinth. His painting A New Journey appeared on the First Minister's Christmas Card in 2009 and featured Burns' niece holding a saltire. In 2014, his 14 for 14 exhibition was launched during the XX Commonwealth Games in Glasgow. His Painting ‘The Rowan’ hung behind Alex Salmonds desk in the Scottish Parliament for the duration of his Tenure as First Minister. His portrait of Alex Salmond was unveiled in the Scottish Portrait gallery in Dec 2015.

In April 2015, on the occasion of Scotland Week, he opened the exhibition A Brush with Inspiration in New York, featuring 16 paintings of notable Scots, from Ewan McGregor to Nicola Sturgeon. After the high-profile SoHo gallery, he decided to show his works to the Scots in a shopping center in Easterhouse, which he saw as "a metaphor... for areas of social deprivation and the thought that there shouldn’t be a postcode lottery when it comes to access to the arts." He donated the paintings to raise money for a new hospice in Glasgow.

Burns usually takes photographs of his subjects before working on their portraits. The painter notes, however, that "each of the various pictorial elements also contains a deeper symbolic meaning... My goal is realism, but it’s by increasingly abstract means that realism is attained.".

Charity work

Burns has donated much of the proceeds from his works for charity. His painting Road to Emmaus raised awareness of the work of Emmaus, a charity helping homeless people. His portrait of Alex Salmond raised 50,000 pounds for CLIC Sargent, a charity supporting children and young people with cancer and their families. The portrait of Billy Connolly raised 40,000 pounds for the National Trust for Scotland. Burns launched a special collection of prints to raise money for Mary's Meals, a charity setting up school feeding projects in some of the world's poorest communities.

Solo exhibitions

 2014: 14 for 14, Glasgow
 2014: Fairhill Winter Exhibition, Glasgow
 2015: A Brush with Inspiration, New York

Collections

Burns' works are kept in several private and public collections.

Corporate and public collections:
 The Royal Bank of Scotland
 Standard Charter Bank
 Hunterian Gallery, Glasgow
 Scottish Parliament (First Ministers Office)
 Accenture, Dublin
 Jesuits (SJ) millennium commission, London

Private owners of his works include:
 Ewan McGregor
 Sir Tom and Marion Hunter
 Sir Philip Green
 Malaysian royal family

Awards

 1997: RGI.\ Winner "N. A. Macfarlane Charitable Trust Award"
 2003: Daily Mail "Not the Turner" competition, first prize

References

External links
 

1961 births
Living people
20th-century Scottish painters
Scottish male painters
21st-century Scottish painters
21st-century Scottish male artists
20th-century Scottish male singers
Artists from Glasgow
Alumni of the Glasgow School of Art
20th-century Scottish male artists